Buraq Air (El-Buraq Air Transport Inc) is an airline with its headquarters on the grounds of Mitiga International Airport in Tripoli, Libya. It currently operates a minor international scheduled network and additional charter services and flights in support of CHC. The airline's base is Mitiga International Airport as the larger Tripoli International Airport hasn't been operational since several years.

History
The airline was established on 22 October 2000, and started operations on 15 November 2001; it is the first privately owned airline in Libya. Its name comes from the buraq, a creature on which the Islamic prophet, Muhammad is believed to have flown from Mecca to Jerusalem, and from there to the various heavens.

As a consequence of the Libyan Civil War and the resulting no-fly zone over the country enforced by NATO in accordance with the United Nations Security Council Resolution 1973, all flight operations with Buraq Air were terminated on 17 March 2011. As of 25 August 2011, at least two Boeing 737-800 were still visible on the tarmac of Tripoli International Airport. It has since resumed operations.

Destinations

Current destinations
As of January 2021, Buraq Air serves the following destinations:

Antalya - Antalya Airport charter
Bodrum - Bodrum Airport charter
Gazipaşa - Gazipaşa Airport charter
Istanbul - Istanbul Airport 
Izmir - Izmir Airport charter
Tekirdağ - Tekirdağ Çorlu Airport charter
Tripoli - Mitiga International Airport base

Terminated destinations
The following destinations were terminated in the wake of the Libyan Civil War:

Aleppo - Aleppo International Airport
Alexandria - Alexandria International Airport
Cairo - Cairo International Airport
Rabat - Rabat-Salé Airport
Sarajevo - Sarajevo International Airport
Tripoli - Tripoli International Airport

Fleet

As of January 2021, the Buraq Air fleet consists of the following aircraft:

Accidents and incidents
On 17 April 2013, a Buraq Air Boeing 737-800 was hit by gun fire while approaching Tripoli International Airport on a domestic flight from Benghazi. There were no injuries and only limited damage; the aircraft made a normal landing.

References
AeroTransport Data Bank

External links

Buraq Air Fleet
Buraq libya

Airlines of Libya
Airlines established in 2001
Airlines banned in the European Union
Libyan brands